The 13th Niue Assembly was a term of the Niue Assembly. Its composition was determined by the 2008 election, held on June 7, 2008.

The Speaker of the 13th Assembly was Atapana Siakimotu.

Members

The members of the 13th Legislative Assembly were:

References

Politics of Niue
Political organisations based in Niue
2008 establishments in Niue
Sittings of the Niue Assembly